The 2013 Pittsburgh Riverhounds season is the club's fourteenth season of existence. It is the Riverhounds' third season playing in the USL Professional Division. It is the first season the Riverhounds will play at Highmark Stadium, a newly built 3,500 capacity soccer specific stadium.

Background 

Before the season began, the Riverhounds announced they would have a new stadium to play in, the 3,500 seat Highmark Stadium located in Pittsburgh's Station Square area.

Competitions

USL Pro

Standings

U.S. Open Cup

Friendlies

Statistics

Squad information 
Statistics up to date as of 8/12*

Transfers

Players in

Players out

See also 

 2013 in American soccer
 2013 USL Pro season
 Pittsburgh Riverhounds

References 

Pittsburgh Riverhounds
Pittsburgh Riverhounds SC seasons
Pittsburgh Riverhounds
Pittsburgh Riverhounds